Kayes (Bambara: ߞߊߦߌ tr. Kayi, Soninké: Xaayi) is a city in western Mali on the Sénégal River with a population of 127,368 at the 2009 census. Kayes is the capital of the administrative region of the same name. The name "Kayes" comes from the Soninké word "karré", which describes a low humid place that floods in rainy season.

History
Prior to French colonial expansion, Kayes was a small village.  Its location on the path of the future Dakar-Niger Railway, and the French need for trade centers, led to the creation of the Kayes market town in 1881.  It remains a transport hub, primarily for Senegalese trade, to this day. In 1892, Kayes became the capital of the French Sudan; Bamako replaced it as the capital, first of the state of Haut Sénégal-Niger on October 17, 1899, then as the capital of all of French Sudan in 1908.

Economy and transport
The town has an international airport (Kayes Airport), and lies on the Dakar-Niger Railway which offered regional passenger train service to Bamako three times a week via Kati and Diamou as of 2013. The area is rich in gold and iron.

Climate
Kayes has a hot semi-arid climate (Köppen climate classification BSh). The climate is subject to the West African Monsoon with all the rainfall occurring  between June and October. August is the wettest month. There is almost no rainfall during the other seven months of the year. Kayes is nicknamed the "pressure cooker of Africa" due to its extreme heat; the town is surrounded by iron-rich mountains which contribute to the temperature. The town has been described as the hottest continuously inhabited town in Africa.

Area
Sites found in and around Kayes include:
 Fort du Médine 
 Gouina Falls,  to the southeast on the Senegal river
 The tata (fortification) of Koniakari, constructed by El Hadj Umar Tall,  to the northeast
 Lake Magui and Lake Doro, both watered by the Kolimbiné River
 The Manantali Dam

See also 
 List of cities in Mali
 Ebola virus disease in Mali

References 

 Portions of this article are a translation of French language Wikipedia's Kayes.

External links
 Colonial history of Kayes, from Web Site of Dr. Jim Jones, "African History Since 1875", West Chester University Department of History.  
 View of Sénégal River Bridge at Kayes: Kidira Border Crossing into Mali, December 16, 2004 by NKOverland.

 
Communes of Kayes Region
French West Africa
Regional capitals in Mali
Senegal River
Populated places established in 1881
1881 establishments in Africa